The Rolex Challenge Tour Grand Final is the season-ending tour championship on the Challenge Tour. The field currently consists of the top 45 players on the Challenge Tour rankings vying for fifteen European Tour cards. It has been played annually since 1995. Initially it was played in Portugal, but has since been held in Cuba, France, Italy, the United Arab Emirates, Oman and Spain.

Since 2010, the Challenge Tour Grand Final has been designated by the Official World Golf Ranking as the Challenge Tour's flagship event. Initially awarding a minimum of 16 ranking points to the winner, compared to 12 for most events, this was increased to 17 points in 2014.

Venues

Winners

Notes

References

External links
Coverage on the Challenge Tour's official site

Challenge Tour events
Golf tournaments in Portugal
Golf tournaments in Cuba
Golf tournaments in France
Golf tournaments in Italy
Golf tournaments in the United Arab Emirates
Golf in Oman
Golf tournaments in Spain
Grand finals
Recurring sporting events established in 1995
1995 establishments in Portugal
Autumn events in the United Arab Emirates